Başkentray, formerly known as the Ankara suburban, is the name of the  long commuter rail line in Ankara, Turkey. It is operated by TCDD Taşımacılık on trackage owned by the Turkish State Railways.

History 

The portion of the rail line from Ankara Station to Sincan was completed in 1892, and a few trains ran daily on it.
It was not until TCDD took over the line that a few suburban trains were put into service. Original service was by a steam engine locomotive, pulling up to 3 cars.  In 1972, the line was electrified, and the E14000 units were put into service. In 2010, the new E23000 sets replaced the old ones. 

On 11 July 2016, the line was closed for 18 months for complete rebuilding (stations and rail lines). It reopened on 12 April 2018 as part of the metropolitan network, with payment by AnkaraKart; four of the 28 stations, Subayevleri, Motor Fabrikası, Gülveren and Topkaya, did not reopen.

Stations 

 Sincan
 Lale
 Elvankent
 Eryaman
 Özgüneş
 Etimesgut
 Havadurağı
 Yıldırım
 Behiçbey
 Marşandiz
 Gazi
 Gazi Mahallesi
 Hipodrom
 Ankara railway station
 Yenişehir (transfer to: Sıhhiye station of Ankara Metro: M1 line)
 Kurtuluş (transfer to: Ankara Metro: Ankaray (A) line)
 Cebeci
 Demirlibahçe
 Saimekadın
 Mamak
 Bağderesi
 Üreğil
 Köstence
 Kayaş

Future Service 
"Sincan Station" Extending to the northwest after: 

 Sincan OSB
 Yenikent
 Yenikent Sanayi
 Akçaören

See also 
 Transport in Turkey
 Turkish State Railways

References

External links 
 https://web.archive.org/web/20100124202329/http://www.tcdd.gov.tr/yolcu/ankbanliyo.htm
 http://www.trainsofturkey.com/w/pmwiki.php/History/CFOA

Ankara
Railway lines in Turkey
Standard gauge railways in Turkey
Railway lines opened in 1929